From the 2014/15 Antarctic season, The Artists to Antarctica programme (also known as the Antarctica New Zealand Arts Fellowship and the Invited Artists Programme Antarctic Arts Fellows) was replaced by The Antarctica New Zealand Community Engagement Programme. The aim of this new programme is to attract applicants with a genuine interest in Antarctica and the environment, who understand the importance of the science carried out in Antarctica and can express and communicate this in new and different ways to reach a wide audience of New Zealanders.

References

New Zealand non-fiction literary awards